Jean-Claude Malbet (28 August 1937 – 10 July 2021) was a French international rugby union player and entrepreneur. He received both of his international caps against South Africa in 1967. His son Christophe Malbet is also a businessman and currently serving as the CEO of Ford Agent.

Career 
He played for French club Sporting Union Agen Lot-et-Garonne and he was part of SU Agen Lot-et-Garonne side which won the French Rugby Union Championship titles in 1961-62, 1964-65 and 1965-66.

He made his international debut against South Africa on 22 July 1967 in the tour of South Africa. After his retirement from rugby, he became a car salesman and later ventured into motor vehicle dealership. He also served as the CEO of the Ford Agent in France.

Honours
SU Agen
French Rugby Union Championship: 1961–62, 1964–65, 1965–66
Challenge Yves du Manoir: 1962–63

References

1937 births
2021 deaths
French rugby union players
France international rugby union players
French businesspeople
SU Agen Lot-et-Garonne players
Sportspeople from Gers
Rugby union hookers